Nordwind Airlines, LLC is a Russian leisure airline. The company is headquartered in Moscow, and its hub is at Sheremetyevo International Airport. Nordwind Airlines primarily operates service between airports in Russia and holiday destinations around the Mediterranean Sea and the Indian Ocean.

History
Nordwind Airlines was founded in August 2008 by the Russian and Turkish branches of tour operator Pegas Touristik and initially operated three Boeing 757-200s.

The number of passengers transported was as follows:

On April 29, 2013, two surface-to-air missiles were fired by unknown forces in Syria at a Nordwind Airlines jet flying from Sharm El Sheikh to Kazan. The pilots took evasive action and the plane continued onto Kazan undamaged.

In 2017, the airline acquired two used A330s.

The Wall Street Journal reported that Nordwind transported approximately 7.4 tons of gold with a market value over $300 million from Venezuela to a refinery near the airport in Entebbe, Uganda. These March 2019 shipments allegedly expose a global underground economy the United States government suspects helps Nicolás Maduro stay in power in Venezuela.

Following the 2022 Russian invasion of Ukraine Nordwind suspended all international flights.

Destinations

Nordwind serves 98 destinations in 28 countries including nine countries and 23 cities in Europe, eight countries and 12 cities in the Middle East and Africa, four countries and four cities in South America, and six countries and 14 cities in Asia.

Fleet
As of May 2022, Nordwind Airlines fleet comprises the following aircraft:

The fleet previously included the following aircraft:
 Airbus A320-200
 Boeing 757-200
 Boeing 767-300ER

References

External links

Airlines established in 2008
Airlines banned in the European Union
Russian brands
Companies based in Moscow
Russian companies established in 2008
Charter airlines of Russia